Rutland Street is a street in central Limerick, Ireland that forms part of the main central thoroughfare of the city which incorporates Rutland Street, Patrick Street and O'Connell Street. Named after the 4th Duke of Rutland, Charles Manners, who was appointed Lord Lieutenant of Ireland in 1784 and visited Limerick in 1785. Rutland Street along with nearby Bank Place features some of Limerick's earliest (and oldest) examples of Georgian Architecture. It was the first street developed as part of Edmund Sexton Pery's plans for Newtown Pery, and was the first part of the great Georgian expansion of Limerick south from the medieval city. In 1901, Irish nationalists suggested renaming the street to Hugh O'Neill Street.

The Hunt Museum is located on Rutland Street. It is located in the former Customs House, designed by architect Davis Ducart. The building dates from 1769.

The headquarters of Limerick Corporation were located in the old Town Hall on the street. Limerick Corporation moved to Merchant's Quay near the City Courthouse in 1990. This then became the Mid West Business Institute before it moved to Upper William Street.

References

Streets in Limerick (city)